Musquash is a Canadian rural community in Saint John County, New Brunswick.

History

Musquash was settled in the early 1800s at the head of navigation on the Musquash River.  The Shore Line Railway (later Canadian Pacific Railway) was built through the community but has since been abandoned.  The community includes the locales of Ivanhoe, West Musquash and Clinch's Mills.  A post office was located in Musquash from 1847 to 1969.  It was largely a farming and lumbering community but is now largely an exurb of Saint John, thanks to being located on the Route 1 expressway.

Notable people

See also
List of lighthouses in New Brunswick
List of communities in New Brunswick

References

External links
 Provincial Archives of New Brunswick - Musquash
 Natural Resources Canada - Musquash
 Picture of the lighthouse
 Aids to Navigation Canadian Coast Guard

Communities in Saint John County, New Brunswick
Lighthouses in New Brunswick